Trzcianka is a town in the Greater Poland Voivodeship (west-central Poland). 

Trzcianka may also refer to:
 Trzcianka, Kuyavian-Pomeranian Voivodeship (north-central Poland)
 Trzcianka, Sokółka County in Podlaskie Voivodeship (north-east Poland)
 Trzcianka, Suwałki County in Podlaskie Voivodeship (north-east Poland)
 Trzcianka, Łódź Voivodeship (central Poland)
 Trzcianka, Kielce County in Świętokrzyskie Voivodeship (south-central Poland)
 Trzcianka, Staszów County in Świętokrzyskie Voivodeship (south-central Poland)
 Trzcianka, Ciechanów County in Masovian Voivodeship (east-central Poland)
 Trzcianka, Gmina Sobolew in Masovian Voivodeship (east-central Poland)
 Trzcianka, Gmina Wilga in Masovian Voivodeship (east-central Poland)
 Trzcianka, Mława County in Masovian Voivodeship (east-central Poland)
 Trzcianka, Przasnysz County in Masovian Voivodeship (east-central Poland)
 Trzcianka, Wyszków County in Masovian Voivodeship (east-central Poland)
 Trzcianka, Nowy Tomyśl County in Greater Poland Voivodeship (west-central Poland)
 Trzcianka, Pomeranian Voivodeship (north Poland)